Paul Aubrey "Hoss" Geisler (June 10, 1909 – August 22, 1956) was an American football player.  He played college football for Centenary College and was selected as a consensus first-team All-American in 1933.

Geisler was born in Berwick, Louisiana, in 1909.  He attended Morgan City High School.  He then enrolled at Centenary College where he played at the end position for the undefeated 1932 and 1933 Centenary Gentlemen football teams.  He was a consensus first-team selection to the 1933 College Football All-America Team.  Geisler began his playing career as a back for the Centenary team, but became a star when he was moved to the end position.  LSU coach Biff Jones said Geisler was as "fast as a streak."

Geisler later transferred to Louisiana College where he completed his undergraduate studies and also served as an assistant coach. He served in the Air Force during World War II, enlisting in 1943, attaining the rank of captain, and receiving his discharge in 1949. Both before and after the war, he worked as a high school coach at Lake Providence and Tallulah, Louisiana. He became a high school principal and later superintendent of schools at Lake Providence.

Geisler was married to Randle Johnson in 1936.  He died of a brain tumor in 1956 at the age of 47. He was posthumously inducted into the Louisiana Sports Hall of Fame in 1967.

References

1909 births
1956 deaths
All-American college football players
American football ends
Centenary Gentlemen football players
Players of American football from Louisiana
United States Army Air Forces personnel of World War II
American school administrators
American school principals
Deaths from brain cancer in the United States
People from Berwick, Louisiana
People from Lake Providence, Louisiana
Educators from Louisiana
United States Army Air Forces officers
Neurological disease deaths in Louisiana
Deaths from cancer in Louisiana
School superintendents in Louisiana